Michael Makkai (24 June 1939 in Budapest, Hungary) is Canadian mathematician of Hungarian origin, specializing in mathematical logic. He works in model theory, category theory, algebraic logic, type theory and the theory of topoi.

Career

Academic biography 
Makkai was awarded his PhD from the Eötvös Loránd University, Budapest, in 1966, having been supervised by Rózsa Péter and Andrzej Mostowski. 
He then worked at the Mathematical Institute of the Hungarian Academy of Sciences. 
Between 1974 and 2010, he was professor of mathematics at McGill University, retiring in 2010. 
He is also an external member of the Hungarian Academy of Sciences (1995).

Work 
With Leo Harrington and Saharon Shelah he proved the Vaught conjecture for ω-stable theories.

With Robert Paré he further developed the theory of Accessible Categories.

Makkai has an Erdős number of 1, having published "Some Remarks on Set Theory, X" with Paul Erdős in 1966.

Selected publications
 M. Makkai, G. E. Reyes: First Order Categorical Logic, Lecture Notes in Mathematics, 611, Springer, 1977, viii+301 pp. 
 L. Harrington, M. Makkai, S. Shelah: A proof of Vaught's conjecture for ω-stable theories, Israel Journal of Mathematics,  49(1984), 259–280. 
  Michael Makkai, Robert Paré: Accessible categories: the foundations of categorical model theory. Contemporary Mathematics, 104. American Mathematical Society, Providence, RI, 1989. viii+176 pp. , 
 M. Makkai: Duality and Definability in First Order Logic, Memoirs of the American Mathematical Society, 503, 1993, ISSN 0065-9266.

References

External links
 Makkai's homepage at the Hungarian Academy of Sciences
 Makkai's homepage at McGill University

1939 births
Living people
Canadian mathematicians
Hungarian emigrants to Canada
20th-century Hungarian mathematicians
21st-century Hungarian mathematicians
Members of the Hungarian Academy of Sciences